Matheus Diovany Pechim dos Santos (born February 10, 1994) is a Brazilian footballer, currently playing for Sport Club Campo Mourão.

Career
Matheus Diovany spent time with Coritiba FC's youth team before signing with Dutch club VVV Venlo in 2012. After one season with the Dutch club, Matheus Diovany signed with USL Pro club Dayton Dutch Lions in March 2014.

References

External links
 
 Matheus Diovany at playmakerstats.com (English version of ogol.com.br)

1994 births
Living people
Brazilian footballers
VVV-Venlo players
Dayton Dutch Lions players
USL Championship players
Association football defenders
Sportspeople from Curitiba